Santiago National, is an extinct Chilean football club based in the city of Santiago. The club was founded in 1900, and it was one of the 8 teams that founded the professional first division of the Chilean football league, in 1933.

Since 1940 until the beginning of 1942 it was known as Santiago National Juventus.

National honors
Copa Apertura: 1
1942
 Serie B: 1
1935

References
 

Defunct football clubs in Chile
Association football clubs established in 1900
Association football clubs disestablished in 1954
Sport in Santiago
1900 establishments in Chile
1954 disestablishments in Chile